Christian Adán Larotonda Adán (born 26 May 1999) is a Venezuelan professional footballer who plays as a midfielder for Primera División club Metropolitanos.

Club career
Born in Caracas, Larotonda began his career with Metropolitanos, making his professional debut for the club on 29 January 2017 against Atlético Venezuela, coming on as an 86th-minute substitute in a 0–0 draw. He scored his first professional goal for the club on 8 March 2020 against Mineros de Guayana.

On 18 March 2021, Larotonda scored his first Copa Sudamericana goal in a 2–0 victory over Academia Puerto Cabello. His performance during the match lead to him being named as the Copa Sudamericana Best Player of the Week.

International career
On 21 January 2020, Larotonda made his debut for the Venezuela under-23 side during the CONMEBOL Pre-Olympic Tournament against Chile, coming on as a substitute in a 1–0 defeat. In November 2020, Larotonda received his first call-up to the Venezuela seniors but had to withdraw from the side after contracting COVID-19.

Career statistics

References

1999 births
Living people
Footballers from Caracas
Venezuelan footballers
Venezuela international footballers
Venezuela youth international footballers
Venezuelan people of Italian descent
Association football midfielders
Metropolitanos FC players
Venezuelan Primera División players
21st-century Venezuelan people